Philip Masato Takahashi (June 12, 1957 – June 15, 2020) was a judoka from Canada, who represented his native country at two consecutive Summer Olympics (1984 and 1988). He twice won a bronze medal at the Pan American Games during his career in the bantamweight division (– 60 kg), in 1979 and 1983. His greatest achievement came as a bronze medal at the 1981 World Championships. In 1986, he won the bronze medal in the 60kg weight category at the judo demonstration sport event as part of the 1986 Commonwealth Games.

He is the son of Masao and June Takahashi. He ran Takahashi Dojo in Ottawa, Ontario teaching Judo, Karate and other forms of martial arts. He also taught both English and Physical Education at Confederation High School (Ottawa). He held the rank of 7th dan in Judo. Takahashi died of cancer in 2020 at the age of 63.

See also
Judo in Ontario
Judo in Canada
List of Canadian judoka

References

External links
 
Takahashi Dojo
 Profile
 sports-reference

1957 births
2020 deaths
Canadian male judoka
Canadian schoolteachers
Canadian sportspeople of Japanese descent
Judoka at the 1984 Summer Olympics
Judoka at the 1988 Summer Olympics
Olympic judoka of Canada
Pan American Games bronze medalists for Canada
Pan American Games medalists in judo
Sportspeople from Ottawa
Sportspeople from Toronto
Judoka at the 1979 Pan American Games
Judoka at the 1983 Pan American Games
Medalists at the 1979 Pan American Games
Medalists at the 1983 Pan American Games
21st-century Canadian people
20th-century Canadian people